Charles Edward Davis, Jr. (born October 5, 1958) is an American former basketball player.

A 6'7" small forward born in Nashville, Tennessee, Davis led the McGavock High School Raiders to a 25–6 record and victory in the Class AAA Tennessee State Championship in 1976. He was selected Most Valuable Player in the championship tournament.

Davis starred at Vanderbilt University during the late 1970s and early 1980s. He was selected in the second round of the 1981 NBA draft by the Washington Bullets and played eight seasons in the National Basketball Association (NBA) as a member of the Bullets, Milwaukee Bucks, San Antonio Spurs, and Chicago Bulls. On March 18, 1986, in perhaps his most notable game as a professional, Davis led the Bucks to a win while scoring 26 points and grabbing 10 rebounds in only 26 minutes of playing time, in a 116–87 victory over the Washington Bullets. Davis scored 2,214 points and grabbed 1,008 rebounds in his NBA career.

In 2006, Davis was the recipient of an NCAA Silver Anniversary Award.

Davis is the cousin of former Vanderbilt women's basketball player Jessica Mooney.

NBA career statistics

Regular season

|-
| align="left" | 1981–82
| align="left" | Washington
| 54 || 10 || 10.6 || .478 || .000 || .811 || 2.5 || 0.6 || 0.2 || 0.2 || 3.8
|-
| align="left" | 1982–83
| align="left" | Washington
| 74 || 10 || 15.7 || .470 || .200 || .629 || 2.9 || 1.0 || 0.4 || 0.3 || 7.6
|-
| align="left" | 1983–84
| align="left" | Washington
| 46 || 0 || 10.2 || .472 || .111 || .615 || 2.2 || 0.7 || 0.3 || 0.2 || 5.0
|-
| align="left" | 1984–85
| align="left" | Washington
| 4 || 0 || 7.0 || .200 || .000 || .750 || 1.0 || 0.3 || 0.3 || 0.0 || 1.8
|-
| align="left" | 1984–85
| align="left" | Milwaukee
| 57 || 2 || 13.1 || .436 || .100 || .828 || 2.6 || 0.9 || 0.4 || 0.1 || 6.2
|-
| align="left" | 1985–86
| align="left" | Milwaukee
| 57 || 7 || 15.3 || .474 || .125 || .813 || 3.0 || 1.0 || 0.5 || 0.1 || 7.7
|-
| align="left" | 1987–88
| align="left" | Milwaukee
| 5 || 0 || 7.8 || .333 || .000 || .000 || 0.6 || 0.6 || 0.4 || 0.2 || 2.4
|-
| align="left" | 1987–88
| align="left" | San Antonio
| 16 || 0 || 11.7 || .433 || .067 || .700 || 2.4 || 1.1 || 0.0 || 0.2 || 5.8
|-
| align="left" | 1988–89
| align="left" | Chicago
| 49 || 3 || 11.1 || .426 || .267 || .731 || 2.3 || 0.6 || 0.2 || 0.1 || 3.8
|-
| align="left" | 1989–90
| align="left" | Chicago
| 53 || 0 || 8.1 || .367 || .280 || .875 || 1.5 || 0.3 || 0.2 || 0.2 || 2.5
|- class="sortbottom"
| style="text-align:center;" colspan="2"| Career
| 415 || 32 || 12.2 || .451 || .170 || .737 || 2.4 || 0.7 || 0.3 || 0.2 || 5.3
|}

Playoffs

|-
| align="left" | 1981–82
| align="left" | Washington
| 6 || - || 8.7 || .412 || .000 || 1.000 || 0.8 || 0.5 || 0.2 || 0.2 || 2.7
|-
| align="left" | 1983–84
| align="left" | Washington
| 3 || - || 5.7 || .583 || .000 || .000 || 1.0 || 0.0 || 0.0 || 0.0 || 4.7
|-
| align="left" | 1984–85
| align="left" | Milwaukee
| 5 || 0 || 10.2 || .400 || .000 || .750 || 2.0 || 0.8 || 0.0 || 0.0 || 3.8
|-
| align="left" | 1985–86
| align="left" | Milwaukee
| 12 || 0 || 12.1 || .362 || .000 || .900 || 2.1 || 0.5 || 0.3 || 0.0 || 5.0
|-
| align="left" | 1988–89
| align="left" | Chicago
| 17 || 0 || 11.2 || .404 || .167 || .778 || 2.5 || 0.3 || 0.2 || 0.1 || 2.7
|-
| align="left" | 1989–90
| align="left" | Chicago
| 6 || 0 || 3.3 || .286 || .000 || .000 || 0.5 || 0.2 || 0.0 || 0.0 || 0.7
|- class="sortbottom"
| style="text-align:center;" colspan="2"| Career
| 49 || 0 || 9.7 || .398 || .091 || .857 || 1.8 || 0.4 || 0.2 || 0.0 || 3.2
|}

References

External links 
 Career statistics

1958 births
Living people
American expatriate basketball people in Italy
American men's basketball players
Basketball players from Nashville, Tennessee
Chicago Bulls players
Milwaukee Bucks players
Power forwards (basketball)
San Antonio Spurs players
Small forwards
Vanderbilt Commodores men's basketball players
Victoria Libertas Pallacanestro players
Washington Bullets draft picks
Washington Bullets players